Nicolae Bălcescu is a commune located in Vâlcea County, Muntenia, Romania. It is composed of seventeen villages: Bănești, Corbii din Vale, Dosu Râului, Ginerica, Gâltofani, Linia Hanului, Măzăraru, Mângureni, Pleșoiu, Popești, Predești, Rotărăști (the commune centre), Schitu,  Șerbăneasa, Tufanii, Valea Bălcească and Valea Viei. The commune received its current name in 1968, when the former communes of Stoiceni and Bălcești were merged.

References

Communes in Vâlcea County
Localities in Muntenia